James Edward Clark (born c. 1926) is a former American football coach. He served as the head football coach at the McNeese State University from 1966 to 1969, compiling a record of 17–22.  Clark attended high school in Belzoni, Mississippi and played college football at the University of Mississippi (Ole Miss) before graduating in 1950.  He earned a master's degree at Mississippi Southern College—now known as University of Southern Mississippi—in 1957.

Head coaching record

College

References

Year of birth missing (living people)
Living people
People from Belzoni, Mississippi
Players of American football from Mississippi
American football tackles
Ole Miss Rebels football players
Coaches of American football from Mississippi
High school football coaches in Mississippi
Junior college football coaches in the United States
High school football coaches in Louisiana
McNeese Cowboys football coaches
University of Southern Mississippi alumni